Mysore Srinivas (17 April 1943 – 16 October 1995), known by his stage name Thoogudeepa Srinivas was an Indian actor who appeared in Kannada films and is remembered for his portrayal of negative-shaded characters. He is the father of actor, Darshan and film director Dinakar.

Early life 
Srinivas was born to Muniswami and Parvathamma in 1943 as their fourth son. He had eight siblings. He lost his parents at a young age. Right from his childhood days, Srinivas was interested in theatre and cinema and was a regular participant in his school and college plays. During one of these plays, he caught the eye of another theatre artist M. P. Shankar, whom he later went on to star with in many Kannada films. Srinivas then became a regular member of Shankar's camp and had to discontinue his education during his pursuing of a Bachelor of Science from St. Philomena's College in Mysore.

Career 
Srinivas made his debut in film in 1966 with K. S. L. Swamy's Kannada film Thoogudeepa. He was from then on referred to as Thoogudeepa Srinivas. He went on to appear in many other successful films such as Mayor Muthanna, Bangaarada Panjara, Gandhada Gudi, Kalla Kulla, Vasantha Lakshmi and Sahasa Simha. He appeared in many films as a villain with Rajkumar as the lead actor and his "partners in crime" included other popular actors such as Vajramuni, Doddanna and Dheerendra Gopal.

Srinivas appeared in an important role in the 1984 film Ramapurada Ravana. He received appreciation for his roles in films such as Sipayi Ramu, Giri Kanye and Bhagyavantharu.

Personal life 
Srinivas married Meena on 15 November 1973 in Ponnampet, Kodagu. The couple have three children together — Darshan, Dinakar and Divya. Darshan is a popular actor in Kannada cinema and Dinakar is a film director.

Having been suffering from diabetes and kidney ailment, Srinivas was given a kidney by his wife Meena. However, he died due to a massive heart attack on 16 October 1995, aged 52.

Partial filmography

 Thoogudeepa (1966)
 Mayor Muthanna (1969)...Sudhakar
 Sipayi Ramu (1971)...Mangal Singh
 Bhale Huchcha (1972)...Shivakumar
 Gandhada Gudi (1973)...Kunju Ahmed
 Bhakta Kumbara (1974)
 Bangaarada Panjara (1974)
 Daari Tappida Maga (1975)
 Mayura (1975)...Kotwal
 Bahaddur Gandu (1976)
 Badavara Bandhu (1976)
 Giri Kanye (1977)
 Sanaadi Appanna (1977)...Shivaraya
 Babruvahana (1977)...Takshaka
 Singaporenalli Raja Kulla (1978)...Junie
 Shankar Guru (1978)...Madanlal
 Operation Diamond Racket (1978)
 Nanobba Kalla...Joginder
 Auto Raja (1980)...Bhaskar Rao
 Aarada Gaaya (1980)
 Ondu Hennu Aaru Kannu (1980)
 Point Parimala (1980)...Dharmaprakash
 Mooroovare Vajragalu (1982)...Bhima
 Sahasa Simha (1982)...Peter
 Khadeema Kallaru (1982)
 Nee Nanna Gellalare (1982)
 Jimmy Gallu (1982)
 Kaviratna Kalidasa (1983)
 Bhakta Prahlada (1983)...Hiranyaksha
 Hosa Theerpu (1983)
 Kaamana Billu (1983)
 Benkiya Bale (1983)
 Apoorva Sangama (1984)...Vishwanath
 Dhruva Thare (1985)...Pavan Kumar
 Ade Kannu (1985)...Mahesh
 Jwaalamukhi (1985)...Ratanlal
 Anuraga Aralithu (1986)
 Ondu Muttina Kathe (1987)...Bollanna
 Devatha Manushya (1988)
 Anjada Gandu (1988)...Major Rudrappa
 Ramanna Shamanna (1988)
 Nanjundi Kalyana (1989)
 Parashuram (1989)...M. Shivaraj
 Gandu Sidigundu (1991)...Shyam
 Halli Meshtru (1992)
 Jeevana Chaitra (1992)...Narasinga Raya
 Kanasina Rani (1992)
 Aakasmika (1993)...Kaatayya "Kaatesh"
 Ananda Jyothi (1993)
 Kalyana Rekhe (1993)

References

External links
 

Indian male film actors
Male actors in Kannada cinema
1943 births
1995 deaths
20th-century Indian male actors